India competed at the 1964 Summer Olympics in Tokyo, Japan. 53 competitors, 52 men and 1 woman, took part in 42 events in 8 sports.

Competitors

Medalists

Gold
 Charanjit Singh (captain), Shankar Lakshman, Rajendran Christie, Prithipal Singh, Dharam Singh, Gurbux Singh, Mohinder Lal, Jagjit Singh, Joginder "Gindi" Singh, Haripal Kaushik, Harbinder Singh, Bandu Patil, Victor John Peter, Udham Singh, Darshan Singh and Syed Mushtaq Ali — Field hockey, Men's Team Competition.

Athletics

Men's 110 metres hurdles
 Gurbachan Singh Randhawa
 Final — 14.09s (5th place)

Men's 200 metres
 Kenneth Powell
 Heat — 21.19s

 Men's marathon
Balkrishan Akotkar 
 Qualification Round — 2:29:27 (33rd place)

 Men's marathon
Harbans Lal 
 Qualification Round — 2:37:05 (43rd place)

Men's Triple Jump
 Labh Singh
 Qualification Round — 14:95 (26th place)

Men's long jump
 S. Bondada Venkata
 Qualification Round — 6.76 (28th place)

Men's 4 × 100 m Relay 
 Anthony Francis Coutinho, Makhan Singh, Kenneth Powell, and Rajasekaran Pichaya
 Round 1 – 40.6
 Semifinal – 40.5 (did not advance)

Cycling

Five cyclists represented India in 1964.

Team time trial
 Amar Singh Billing, Chetan Singh Hari, Dalbir Singh Gill, and Amar Singh Sokhi

Sprint
 Suchha Singh
 Amar Singh Billing

1000m time trial
 Dalbir Singh Gill

Individual pursuit
 Amar Singh Sokhi

Team pursuit
 Amar Singh Billing, Chetan Singh Hari, Dalbir Singh Gill, and Amar Singh Sokhi

Diving

Gymnastics

Hockey

Group B

 India tied Spain 1-1
 India tied United Team of Germany 1-1
 India def. Netherlands 2-1
 India def. Malaysia 3-1
 India def. Belgium 2-0
 India def. Canada 3-0
 India def. Hong Kong 6-0
 Spain tied United Team of Germany 1-1
 Spain tied Netherlands 1-1
 Spain def. Malaysia 3-0
 Spain def. Belgium 3-0
 Spain def. Canada 3-0
 Spain def. Hong Kong 4-0
 United Team of Germany def. Netherlands 1-0
 United Team of Germany tied Malaysia 0-0
 United Team of Germany tied Belgium 0-0
 United Team of Germany def. Canada 5-1
 United Team of Germany tied Hong Kong 1-1
 Netherlands def. Malaysia 2-0
 Netherlands def. Belgium 4-0
 Netherlands def. Canada 5-0
 Netherlands def. Hong Kong 7-0
 Malaysia tied Belgium 3-3
 Malaysia def. Canada 3-1
 Malaysia def. Hong Kong 4-1
 Belgium def. Canada 5-1
 Belgium def. Hong Kong 2-0
 Canada def. Hong Kong 2-1

Semifinals
The top two teams in each of the groups played in the 1st-4th semifinals, with the winner of each group playing the second-place team in the other group.  The third and fourth team in each group played in the consolation semifinals

Finals
The winners of the semifinals played for the gold and silver medals, while the losers played for the bronze medal and 4th place.  The winners of the consolation semifinals played for 5th and 6th places.

Shooting

Two shooters represented India in 1964.

Trap
Karni Singh
 Qualification Round — 186 (26th place)

Devi Singh
 Qualification Round — 168 (49th place)

Weightlifting

Wrestling

Men's Freestyle

Men's Greco-Roman

References

Nations at the 1964 Summer Olympics
1964
1964 in Indian sport